The  or CPS-2 is an arcade system board that Capcom first used in 1993 for Super Street Fighter II. It was the successor to their previous CP System and Capcom Power System Changer arcade hardware and was succeeded by the CP System III hardware in 1996, of which the CPS-2 would outlive by over four years. The arcade system had new releases for it until the end of 2003, ending with Hyper Street Fighter II.

History

The earlier Capcom system board, the original CP System (or CPS-1), while successful, was very vulnerable to bootleggers making unauthorized copies of games. In order to rectify the situation, Capcom took the CP System hardware (with QSound) with minimal changes and employed encryption on the program ROMs to prevent software piracy. Due to the encryption, the system was never bootlegged until unencrypted program data became available.

Capcom announced the development of the CPS-2 in 1990. They had planned to complete and release the CPS-2 in 18 months. They also originally had plans for the system to be capable of 3D graphics.

The CP System II consists of two separate parts; the A board, which connects to the JAMMA harness and contains components common between all CP System II games, and the B board, which contains the game itself. The relationship between the A and B board is very similar to that between a home video game console and cartridge. CP System II A and B boards are color-coded by region, and each board can only be used with its same-colored mate. The exception to this is that the blue and green boards can be used together.

The B boards hold battery-backed memory containing decryption keys needed for the games to run.  As time passes, these batteries lose their charge and the games stop functioning, because the CPU cannot execute any code without the decryption keys.  This is generally referred to as a "suicide battery".  It is possible to bypass the original battery and swap it out with a new one in-circuit, but this must be done before the original falls below 2V or the keys will be lost. Consequently the board would die, even if used legally it would not play after a finite amount of time unless a fee was paid to Capcom to replace it.

Due to the heavy encryption, it was believed for a long time that CP System II emulation was next to impossible. However, in January 2001, the CPS-2 Shock group was able to obtain unencrypted program data by hacking into the hardware, which they distributed as XOR difference tables to produce the unencrypted data from the original ROM images, making emulation possible, as well as restoring cartridges that had been erased because of the suicide system.

In January 2007, the encryption method was fully reverse-engineered by Andreas Naive  and Nicola Salmoria. It has been determined that the encryption employs two four-round Feistel ciphers with a 64-bit key. The algorithm was thereafter implemented in this state for all known CPS-2 games in MAME.

In April 2016, Eduardo Cruz, Artemio Urbina and Ian Court announced the successful reverse engineering of Capcom's CP System II security programming, enabling the clean "de-suicide" and restoration of any dead games without hardware modifications.

Region colors

Technical specifications

CPU:
Primary: Capcom DL-1525 (encrypted 68000) @ 16 MHz
Sound: Kabuki DL-030P (encrypted Z80, but encryption not used) or standard Z80 @ 8 MHz
Capcom custom chipset:
GPU: CPS-A & CPS-B Graphics Processors @ 16 MHz (same as CPS-1)
Sound chip: Lucent DL-1425 Q1 QSound DSP16A Processor @ 4 MHz
DRAM Refresh Controller: DL-2227
I/O Controller: DL-1123
Display:
Active resolution: 384×224 pixels
Overscan resolution: 512×262 (262 scanlines)
Sprites: 900 on screen
Colors:
Depth: 32-bit (RGBA)
Palette: 16,777,216 colors (24-bit)
Alpha transparency: 256 levels (8-bit)
Colors on screen: 4096 (12-bit)
Colors per tile: 16 (4-bit)
RAM: 1328 KB (1 MB FPM DRAM, 304 KB SRAM)
A-Board: 1 MB FPM DRAM, 280 KB SRAM (256 KB video, 16 KB I/O, 8 KB sound)
B-Board: 16 KB SRAM (2× 8 KB)
Communication Board: 8 KB SRAM
Maximum ROM capacity: 322 Mbit (40.25 MB)
Dimensions (A+B board pair): 40 x 27 x 8 cm

List of games (42 games)

See also
 CP System
 CP System III

References

External links
 Technical information in the MAME CPS-2 driver
 CPS-2 Shock - Technical Information
 CPS-2 at System 16 - The Arcade Museum
 CPS-2 Keystone Suicide Battery Retainer Mod - JAMMAPARTS.COM 
 CPS-1, CPS-2 and CPS-3 releases comparison

Capcom arcade system boards
68k-based arcade system boards

de:Capcom Play System